Edgard Viseur (born 10 April 1905, date of death unknown) was a Belgian middle-distance runner. He competed in the men's 3000 metres steeplechase at the 1928 Summer Olympics.

References

1905 births
Year of death missing
Athletes (track and field) at the 1928 Summer Olympics
Belgian male middle-distance runners
Belgian male steeplechase runners
Olympic athletes of Belgium
Place of birth missing